Sina Saeidifar (born 12 April 2001) is an Iranian footballer who plays for Persian Gulf Pro League club Esteghlal and the Iran national team U23.

Club career

Esteghlal
He joined Esteghlal in September 2021 with five-years contract. He made his debut on 7 February 2023 against Naft Masjed-Soleyman as a substitute for Alireza Rezaei.

Honours
Esteghlal

 Persian Gulf Pro League: 2021–22
 Iranian Super Cup: 2022

References

2001 births
Living people
Iranian footballers
Association football goalkeepers
Saipa F.C. players
Esteghlal F.C. players
Persian Gulf Pro League players